Tyler Ennis may refer to:

 Tyler Ennis (basketball), Canadian basketball player
 Tyler Ennis (ice hockey), Canadian ice hockey player